The slope deflection method is a structural analysis method for beams and frames introduced in 1914 by George A. Maney. The slope deflection method was widely used for more than a decade until the moment distribution method was developed. In the book, "The Theory and Practice of Modern Framed Structures", written by J.B Johnson, C.W. Bryan and F.E. Turneaure, it is stated that this method was first developed "by Professor Otto Mohr in Germany, and later developed independently by Professor G.A. Maney". According to this book, professor Otto Mohr introduced this method for the first time in his book, "Evaluation of Trusses with Rigid Node Connections" or "Die Berechnung der Fachwerke mit Starren Knotenverbindungen".

Introduction 
By forming slope deflection equations and applying joint and shear equilibrium conditions, the rotation angles (or the slope angles) are calculated. Substituting them back into the slope deflection equations, member end moments are readily determined. Deformation of member is due to the bending moment.

Slope deflection equations 

The slope deflection equations can also be written using the stiffness factor  and the chord rotation :

Derivation of slope deflection equations 
These rotation angles can be calculated using the unit force method or Darcy's Law.

Rearranging these equations, the slope deflection equations are derived.

Equilibrium conditions

Joint equilibrium 
Joint equilibrium conditions imply that each joint with a degree of freedom should have no unbalanced moments i.e. be in equilibrium. Therefore,

Shear equilibrium 
When there are chord rotations in a frame, additional equilibrium conditions, namely the shear equilibrium conditions need to be taken into account.

Example 

The statically indeterminate beam shown in the figure is to be analysed.
Members AB, BC, CD have the same length .
Flexural rigidities are EI, 2EI, EI respectively.
Concentrated load of magnitude  acts at a distance  from the support A.
Uniform load of intensity  acts on BC.
Member CD is loaded at its midspan with a concentrated load of magnitude .
In the following calculations, clockwise moments and rotations are positive.

Degrees of freedom 
There are no chord rotations due to other causes including support settlement.

Fixed end moments 
Fixed end moments are:

Slope deflection equations 
The slope deflection equations are constructed as follows:

Joint equilibrium equations 
Joints A, B, C should suffice the equilibrium condition. Therefore

Rotation angles 
The rotation angles are calculated from simultaneous equations above.

Member end moments 
Substitution of these values back into the slope deflection equations yields the member end moments (in kNm):

See also 
Beam theory

Notes

References 

Structural analysis